The Jharkhand International Film Festival Awards  (also known as the JIFFA) are a set of awards presented annually to film makers and artists for theirs contribution to Cinema. It aims to provide common platform for cinemas of world to project excellence of film arts. It supports filmmaking and promotion of all genres.

History
The first Jharkhand International film festival had held on 2018 in Mega Sports Complex of State capital of Jharkhand in Ranchi.

Awards ceremonies
The following is a list of Jharkhand International Film Festival Awards ceremonies since 2018.

Awards

Global/Hindi
Films on Mahatma Gandhi (Documentary, Short, Feature)
Short Films
Documentary Films
Student / Diploma films
Feature Films
Animation Films

Indian Regional
Short Films
Documentary Films
Student / Diploma films
Feature Films
Animation Films
Music & Video Albums

Jharkhand Regional
Short Films
Documentary Films
Student / Diploma films
Feature Films
Animation Films
Music & Video Albums

See also
Cinema of Jharkhand
Cinema of India

References

Festivals in India
Jharkhand